Gensis may refer to:

 Gensis, the possible name of an ancient Roman town at Koviljkin grad, Serbia
 Gensis (vicus), an ancient Roman vicus in Moesia Superior

See also

 Gensi (disambiguation)